University Arts & Science College is one of the oldest Arts and Science colleges in Telangana. It is located in Subedari, Hanamakonda. The college offers Undergraduate and Postgraduate courses. It is also called the second campus of the Kakatiya University.

History
Development of this college began in the year 1927, when it was started as Collegiate High School. In 1954 the college was shifted from Government Junior College Buildings, Hanamkonda to its present location. In 1959 the college was upgraded as a constituent college of Osmania University offering undergraduate courses in the faculties of Arts, Science & Commerce. With the establishment of Kakatiya University, the college was transferred from Osmania University to Kakatiya University on 19 August 1976. In 1995 Postgraduate courses were also added.

Campus
College is located in Subedari, Hanamakonda on the National Highway 163, and is well connected by rail and road transport. The College has a sophisticated English Language Laboratory, Library with reading halls and internet facility, Air-conditioned seminar hall, Computer labs, highly sophisticated Biotechnology and Microbiology Laboratories along with regular labs like Physics, Electronics, Chemistry, Botany and Zoology.  70 years old  Auditorium and amphitheatre, Health Center, Multi-Gym and a large playground. The entire college campus is covered with a high-speed Internet facility.

Academics
College offers 29 courses & course combinations at Undergraduate and Postgraduate levels which includes – Biotechnology, Business Management, Commerce, Computer Applications, Computer Science, Electronics, Hindi, Human Resource Management, Microbiology, Organic Chemistry, Social Work, and Statistics..

Alumni
College has produced many eminent people who have held prestigious positions. List includes former Prime Minister of India Sri P. V. Narasimha Rao, Vice-Chancellors, IAS/IPS officers, Chief Justice of a High Court, Judges, Doctors, Engineers, Journalists, Poets, prominent Social workers, and more.

Notable alumni 
Sri P. V. Narasimha Rao, Politician, former Prime Minister of India.
Mr. Ajit Khan, famous Hindi actor, who acted more than 40 years.
Sri Kaloji Narayana Rao, Telugu Poet and Activist.
Sri Kothapalli Jayashankar, Educationalist, Activist, Professor, Former-Vice-Chancellor-Kakatiya University, Former Registrar-CIEFL-Hyderabad(aka EFLU).
Sri Daasarathi Krishnamacharyulu, Telugu poet and writer.
Sri Pamulaparthi Sadasiva Rao, Philosopher, and Freelance Journalist.
Sri Nukala Ramachandra Reddy, renowned politician and freedom fighter.
Sri Pervaram Jagannatham, Telugu Poet and Former Vice-Chancellor- Potti Sri Ramulu Telugu University-Hyderabad.
Sri Pervaram Ramulu, IPS, Ex.DGP-AP, Politician.
Sri Nerella Venu Madhav, World Famous Mimicry Artist.
Sri Prof. Navaneetha Rao Thangeda, Former-Vice-Chancellor-Osmania University.
Sri Nand Kishore, an Indian former first-class cricketer.
Sri Prof. V. Gopal Reddy, Former-Vice-Chancellor-Kakatiya University.
Sri Mimicry Srinivos, an International impressionist (entertainment), Ventriloquist and India's very first sound illusionist.
Sri Mime Kaladhar, an International Mime Artist, Limca book of World Record Holder for his 24 hours non-stop mime performance in 1993, He is popularized as Indian Mr.Bean.
Sri Dr. Perugu Shyam, Former Scientist at ICMR-NIN, and currently Professor at National Institute of Technology, Warangal.
Sri Suresh K Golle, Faculty - Media Studies, Birla Global University, Bhubaneswar, Odisha
K. Reuben Mark, the present Bishop in Karimnagar (2015 onwards)
Mr. Imam Baba Shaik, Revenue Officer-Telangana Govt.
Sri Shailaja Akkapeli, Activist, Feminist and Poet.
Sri Keerthi Nayakwadi, NRI Entreprenneur in USA.
Late Sri Dheekonda Sarangapani, Folk Singer, Playback Singer, Telugu Film Music Director.
Sri Jeevan, Cinema Artist - ETV Jabardasth Comedian.
Sri Shankar Naik , Sub Inspector of Police, Telangana State Government.

References 

Education in Warangal
Arts colleges in India
Government universities and colleges in India
1927 establishments in India
Educational institutions established in 1927